Louis Bourguet (23 April 1678, Nîmes  – 31 December 1742, Neuchâtel) was a polymath and correspondent of Leibniz who wrote on archaeology, geology, philosophy, Biblical scholarship and mathematics.

Bourguet entered the College of Zurich in 1688. He became Professor of Philosophy and Mathematics at Neuchâtel in 1731. He tried to integrate Leibnizian philosophy with issues in natural philosophy.

Works

 
Traité des petrifications, 1742

References

External links

Lettres philosophiques sur la formation de sels et des crystaux (1729, French) - digital facsimile from Linda Hall Library
Traité des petrifications (1742, French) - digital facsimile from Linda Hall Library
 

1678 births
1742 deaths
French archaeologists
French geologists